Admiral Hope may refer to:

George Hope (Royal Navy officer) (1869–1959), British Royal Navy admiral
George Johnstone Hope (1767–1818), British Royal Navy rear admiral
Henry Hope (Royal Navy officer) (1787–1863), British Royal Navy admiral
James Hope (Royal Navy officer) (1808–1881), British Royal Navy admiral
William Johnstone Hope (1766–1831), British Royal Navy vice admiral

See also
William James Hope-Johnstone (1798–1878), British Royal Navy admiral